Anatoly Mikhailovich Smirnov (born September 5, 1935 in Moscow Oblast, Soviet Union) is a Russian scientist, Academician of the Russian Academy of Sciences (since 2013), Academician of the Russian Academy of Agricultural Sciences (since 1995), Foreign Member of the National Academy of Agrarian Sciences of Ukraine (since 1995), Academician of the Academy of Agrarian Sciences of Mongolia, Doctor of Veterinary Medicine (Dsc), Honored Scientist of the Russian Federation (1999). From 1992 to 2015, he was Director of the All-Russian  Research Institute for Veterinary Sanitation, Hygiene and Ecology, Moscow, Russia. In 1987 he received the title of Professor.

He graduated from the Vitebsk State Academy of Veterinary Medicine in 1959.

He is a member of the Editorial Board for Pchelovodstvo.

Academician Smirnov is the author more than 500 scientific works, including 2 monographs.

He was awarded:
 Order of the Red Banner of Labour (1981)
 Order of Honour (2005)
 Medals of VDNKh

References

External links  
 Russian Academy of Sciences
 Russian Academy of Agricultural Sciences
 National Academy of Agrarian Sciences of Ukraine

Living people
1935 births
Russian veterinarians
Full Members of the Russian Academy of Sciences
Academicians of the Russian Academy of Agriculture Sciences
Honoured Scientists of the Russian Federation
Russian professors
Soviet professors